The 1985 California Angels season involved the Angels taking 2nd place in the American League West with a 90-72 record, finishing one game behind the eventual World Series champions, the Kansas City Royals.

Offseason
 November 7, 1984: Ellis Valentine was released by the Angels.
 January 11, 1985: Rob Picciolo was released by the California Angels.
 January 30, 1985: Ruppert Jones was signed as a free agent with the California Angels.
 March 31, 1985: Bill Mooneyham was released by the Angels.

Regular season
 October 6, 1985: Rufino Linares hit a home run in the last at-bat of his career.

Season standings

Record vs. opponents

Notable transactions
 June 3, 1985: Bo Jackson was drafted by the Angels in the 20th round of the 1985 amateur draft, but did not sign.
 June 19, 1985: Tommy John was released by the Angels.
 August 2, 1985: Pat Clements, Mike Brown and a player to be named later were traded by the Angels to the Pittsburgh Pirates for John Candelaria, George Hendrick and Al Holland. The Angels completed the deal by sending Bob Kipper to the Pirates on August 16.
 September 10, 1985: The Angels traded players to be named later to the Oakland Athletics for Don Sutton. The Angels completed the deal by sending Robert Sharpnack (minors) and Jerome Nelson (minors) to the Athletics on September 25.

Roster

Player stats

Batting

Starters by position
Note: Pos = Position; G = Games played; AB = At bats; H = Hits; Avg. = Batting average; HR = Home runs; RBI = Runs batted in

Other batters
Note: G = Games played; AB = At bats; H = Hits; Avg. = Batting average; HR = Home runs; RBI = Runs batted in

Pitching

Starting pitchers
Note: G = Games pitched; IP = Innings pitched; W = Wins; L = Losses; ERA = Earned run average; SO = Strikeouts

Other pitchers
Note: G = Games pitched; IP = Innings pitched; W = Wins; L = Losses; ERA = Earned run average; SO = Strikeouts

Relief pitchers
Note: G = Games pitched; W = Wins; L = Losses; SV = Saves; ERA = Earned run average; SO = Strikeouts

Farm system

References

1985 California Angels at Baseball Reference
1985 California Angels  at Baseball Almanac

Los Angeles Angels seasons
California Angels season
Los